"The Strip" is a song recorded by the Danish band Scarlet Pleasure. It was released on November 3, 2014 as their third official single. It was originally released on their debut EP Mirage on September 22, but later became a single with a music video too.

References 

Scarlet Pleasure songs
2014 singles
2014 songs
Copenhagen Records singles